Eric Björkander (born 11 June 1996) is a Swedish footballer who plays for Turkish club Altay as a defender.

References

External links

1996 births
Living people
Swedish footballers
Sweden youth international footballers
Association football defenders
Mjällby AIF players
GIF Sundsvall players
Altay S.K. footballers
Allsvenskan players
Superettan players
Süper Lig players
Swedish expatriate footballers
Expatriate footballers in Turkey
Swedish expatriate sportspeople in Turkey